Norman Judd Gould (March 15, 1877 – August 20, 1964) was a Republican member of the United States House of Representatives from New York.

Biography
Gould was born in Seneca Falls, New York. He graduated from Cornell University in 1899, where he was a member of the Quill and Dagger society. He was a delegate to the 1908 and 1916 Republican National Conventions. He was chairman of the Seneca County Republican committee from 1912 until 1923 and served as the eastern manager for Leonard Wood's presidential campaign in 1920. He was elected to Congress in 1915 to fill the vacancy caused by the death of Sereno E. Payne and served from November 2, 1915, until March 3, 1923. He died in Geneva, New York.

Gould was the grandson of Congressman Norman B. Judd, who nominated Abraham Lincoln for President at the 1860 Republican National Convention.

Sources

1877 births
1964 deaths
People from Seneca Falls, New York
Cornell University alumni
Republican Party members of the United States House of Representatives from New York (state)